Jajireddigudem is a village in Suryapet district of the Indian state of Telangana. It is located in Jajireddygudem mandal of Suryapet division..It is about 30 km from the district headquarters Suryapet.

References

Mandal headquarters in Suryapet district
Villages in Suryapet district